Formerly an FBI Special Agent, Fritz Howard, who is now Deputy Chief of the LAPD Special Operations Bureau, is a fictional character featured in the TNT programs The Closer and Major Crimes, and is portrayed by Jon Tenney. Fritz received his initial training at the FBI Academy in Quantico, Virginia and has been working for the FBI in Los Angeles for the three years prior to Brenda Johnson's arrival in Los Angeles to become an LAPD Deputy Chief. Fritz is an old friend of Brenda's and has known her since at least her time in Washington, D.C.  Fritz and Brenda were married in the last episode of Season Four of The Closer. Fritz not only provides her with access to FBI resources and inside information when local resources are unavailable, he also provides emotional grounding for the passionate Brenda, who can get overly caught up in her investigations. He later continues to aid the Major Crimes Division (MCD) as their FBI liaison after Johnson leaves MCD and, during season 3 of Major Crimes, he retires from the FBI to become Deputy Chief of Special Operations Bureau, covering LAPD's SWAT, K-9, Air, Mounted and other special units.

Character history
Extremely smart and well-liked, Howard has many law enforcement connections and knows how to track down information for criminal cases. He is a true gentleman.  Throughout The Closer, he would do practically anything for Brenda. He is also very patient and tolerates her work addiction; for example, he is willing to wait hours or even days for her to wrap up a case so that he can see her. When Brenda's mother came to town as the two were moving in together, Fritz suffered a charade for Brenda's sake, and kept all his possessions in a U-Haul trailer so her mother wouldn't find out. He is extremely kind, almost to a fault, when it comes to Brenda, and he is so supportive and loving to her that he might even overstep professional bounds and risk his career to help her with cases. He endures ribbing from his fellow agents as a result of the assistance he gives to the Major Crimes Division (MCD), formerly the Priority Homicide Division, the LAPD division headed by Brenda. In the third season Brenda learns that Fritz had two DUIs some years earlier, and is a recovering alcoholic. In Major Crimes, when asked if Howard was a bureaucrat or "one of the good guys", the squad stated he was one of the good guys and not so bad for an FBI agent.

Howard continues as FBI Liaison to the LAPD in the series Major Crimes.  In season 3, Assistant Chief of Operations Russell Taylor suggests Howard for the job of Deputy Chief of the Special Operations Bureau of the LAPD, pointing out that he is an excellent candidate whose 27 years with the FBI means that he could easily retire with his full pension and start a second career. After helping resolve a hostage situation, Howard ultimately accepts the job and spends his last days as an FBI agent helping solve a case, before officially taking up the job, However, Howard has a heart attack that he keeps secret from all but Tao, including his wife Brenda. This heart attack requires him to wear an external pacemaker.

During season 5, Deputy Chief Howard temporarily serves as Acting Assistant Chief of Operations, after Taylor is murdered. In this duty, Howard continues to work alongside the MCD while the LAPD works on a permanent replacement for Taylor. When Commander Leo Mason is promoted to Assistant Chief of Operations, Howard is able to resume his preferred role as Deputy Chief of the Special Operations Bureau. He is also aware of Sharon's impending promotion to the open Commander rank and congratulates her as the last person to call Sharon "Captain".

Notes

Fictional alcohol abusers
Fictional Federal Bureau of Investigation personnel
Fictional Los Angeles Police Department officers
The Closer characters